Cancer-related cognitive impairment may refer to :

 Post-chemotherapy cognitive impairment, also known as Chemotherapy-Related Cognitive Impairment
 Radiation-induced cognitive decline